Several political parties from around the world have been called the Liberal Democratic Party or Liberal Democrats. These parties usually follow a liberal democratic ideology.

Active parties

Former parties

See also
Liberal democracy
Liberal Party
Liberal Democrats (disambiguation)
Democratic Party (disambiguation)
Democratic Liberal Party (disambiguation)
Free Democratic Party (disambiguation)

Political parties